Eusirus is a genus of amphipods belonging to the family Eusiridae.

The genus has cosmopolitan distribution.

Species

Species:

Eusirus abyssi 
Eusirus antarcticus 
Eusirus bathybius 
Eusirus pontomedon sp. nov.

References

Amphipoda